Tulia is the debut studio album by Polish folk band Tulia. The album was released in May 2018 and re-released in November 2018.  The album peaked at number 7 on the Polish charts and has been certified platinum.

Track listing

Charts

Release history

References

2018 debut albums